Léry may refer to:
 Léry, Côte-d'Or, a commune in the Côte-d'Or department in France
 Léry, Eure, a commune in the Eure department in France
 Léry, Quebec, Canada
 Jean de Léry (1536–1613), French explorer and writer
 François-Joseph Chaussegros de Léry (1754-1824), Canadian born military engineer
 Saint-Léry, a commune in the Morbihan department in  France